Bobby Parker may refer to:

 Bobby Parker (footballer, born 1891), Scottish footballer (Rangers, Everton)
 Bobby Parker (footballer, born 1925) (1925–1997), Scottish footballer (Heart of Midlothian)
 Bobby Parker (footballer, born 1952), English footballer (Carlisle United, Queen of the South)
 Bobby Parker (guitarist) (1937–2013), American rhythm and blues musician

See also
 Bob Parker (disambiguation)
 Robert Parker (disambiguation)